Claude Reiter (born 2 July 1981) is a retired Luxembourgian footballer who most recently played for FC Etzella Ettelbruck as a defender in the National Division.

Club career
Reiter began his career at local club Rambrouch. He moved to Union Luxembourg in 1999. In 2005, he was signed by Jeunesse Esch. He left Jeunesse for Etzella Ettelbruck in summer 2007.

International career
Reiter made his debut for Luxembourg in April 2000, a friendly match against Estonia. He scored his first goal for Luxembourg in a As of December 2008, he has earned 37 caps, scoring one goal.

International goals
Scores and results list Luxembourg's goal tally first.

References

External links
 
 
 

1981 births
Living people
Luxembourgian footballers
Racing FC Union Luxembourg players
Jeunesse Esch players
FC Etzella Ettelbruck players
Luxembourg international footballers
Association football defenders